Route 630 is a  long mostly north–south secondary highway in McAdam Parish, New Brunswick, Canada.

The route starts at Route 122 in Canterbury where it travels south through a sparsely populated area past Carroll Ridge and past several lakes including Amelia Lake, Moose Lake, Sixth Lake, Fifth Lake, East Brook Lake, and Spednic Lake on the Canada/US Border.  The road passes First Lake before crossing Route 4 near St. Croix. The road continues through a mostly treed area to Meredith Settlement before ending in Andersonville at Route 3.

in 2013, Route 630 was nominated for the worst road in Atlantic Canada.

History

See also

References

630
630